The Pyithu Hluttaw or People's Assembly was the unicameral legislature of the Socialist Republic of the Union of Burma from 1974 to 1988. It was established under the 1974 Constitution of Burma and disbanded with the takeover of the State Law and Order Restoration Council (SLORC) in 1988.

Following the 1962 Burmese coup d'état, there was no functional legislature in existence from 1962 to 1974, as the Revolutionary Council of The Union of Burma served in its capacity.

Under the 1974 Constitution, the People's Assembly was composed of members of the Burma Socialist Programme Party. Each term was four years. (In August 2010, the old Hluttaw complex on Yangon's Pyay Road used by Gen. Ne Win's military government was slated for occupation by Yangon Region government office and Yangon Region Hluttaw)

References

Legislatures of Myanmar
1974 establishments in Burma
1988 disestablishments in Burma
Defunct unicameral legislatures